This is a list of notable Turkish entrepreneurs.

A
Aydın Doğan

B
Bülent Eczacıbaşı

E
Erol Sabancı

F
Ferit Şahenk

H
Hüsnü Özyeğin

M
Mehmet Karamehmet 
Murat Ülker
Murat Vargı

Ö
Ömer Sabancı

R
Rahmi Koç

S
Suat Günsel
Suna Kıraç

Ş
Şarık Tara 
Şevket Sabancı

T
Turgay Ciner

External links
 Ekonomist Magazine 
Forbes World's Richest People - By country of citizenship
Forbes.com: Forbes World's Richest People - By country of residence

Entrepreneurs
Turkey
List